The Isotta Fraschini Asso Caccia, a.k.a. Isotta Fraschini Asso-450 Caccia, was an air-cooled, supercharged V12 piston aero engine produced in the late 1920s and early 1930s by Italian manufacturer Isotta Fraschini.

Design
The Asso Caccia had a V-cylinder configuration, with cylinders made of carbon steel, equipped with cooling fins, mounted separately from each other, to which a single head per cylinder was connected. Above them, two light alloy carters, one per group of cylinders, had the function of connecting the cylinder heads and the intake ducts as well as containing, closed by a cover, the tappets and the distribution members. 

The crankshaft, made of special steel, was supported by a series of 8 bearings, with the insertion in the rear position between the last two of a double bearing and thrust ball bearing, which had the task of supporting the effort of the propeller whether it is mounted in a pulling or pushing configuration.

Applications
 Fiat CR.1
 Fiat CR.20

Specifications

See also

References

1930s aircraft piston engines
Asso Caccia